Sumaylı is a village in the municipality of Göyəm in the Zaqatala Rayon of Azerbaijan.

References

Populated places in Zaqatala District

GFHGFHFG